Samuel Lopes Robalo Pedro (born 24 April 2001) is a Portuguese professional footballer who plays as a winger for Norwegian First Division side FK Jerv.

Club career

Boavista
Born in Aveiro, Pedro began playing football at hometown club Beira-Mar, and played for several other youth teams including Braga and Boavista. He made his professional debut in his only appearance for the latter on 6 December 2019, a 4–1 Primeira Liga home loss to Benfica in which he came on as a 69th-minute substitute for Gustavo Sauer.

Benfica
On 20 January 2020, 18-year-old Pedro signed a contract of undisclosed length at Benfica, while Boavista retained 50% of his economic rights. He played for the B-team in the second tier, scoring his first senior goal on 25 November to decide a 3–2 win at nearby Cova da Piedade.

Pedro was loaned to Covilhã in the same league on 5 January 2022. He played 13 games over the remainder of the season, being recalled two games early as the team stayed up via the play-offs; he scored once as a late substitute on 13 March to conclude a 2–0 home win over Trofense.

Olimpija Ljubljana
On 8 July 2022, Pedro signed a three-year contract with Slovenian PrvaLiga side Olimpija Ljubljana. He made his debut nine days later as the season began with a 2–0 home win over Mura, in which he came on after 58 minutes for Aldair and scored in added time.

International career
Pedro was capped once by Portugal at under-19 level. On 25 February 2020, he played the first half of a 3–1 friendly win over France in Marinha Grande.

References

External links
 
 
 
 

2001 births
Living people
People from Aveiro, Portugal
Sportspeople from Aveiro District
Association football wingers
Portuguese footballers
Portugal youth international footballers
Boavista F.C. players
S.L. Benfica B players
S.C. Covilhã players
NK Olimpija Ljubljana (2005) players
FK Jerv players
Primeira Liga players
Liga Portugal 2 players
Slovenian PrvaLiga players

Portuguese expatriate footballers
Portuguese expatriate sportspeople in Slovenia
Expatriate footballers in Slovenia
Portuguese expatriate sportspeople in Norway
Expatriate footballers in Norway